The Puget Sound and Pacific Railroad  operates over 150 miles of track serving the U.S. State of Washington, and is headquartered in Centralia, Washington where interchanges with the BNSF Railway and Union Pacific Railroad are made.

History
The company began operations on August 30, 1997, when the line was purchased from the Burlington Northern Santa Fe Railway (BNSF) by the ParkSierra Railgroup, which also formed the Arizona and California Railroad and the California Northern Railroad. The ParkSierra Railgroup was purchased in January 2002 by RailAmerica. In 2012, RailAmerica was purchased by Genesee and Wyoming Inc with an STB approval in December 2012.

The PSAP interchanges with BNSF Railway and Union Pacific Railroad near Centralia, Washington. This line serves Naval Base Kitsap with its only rail connection to the rest of the North American rail network.

Much of the line was originally constructed by the Puget Sound & Grays Harbor Railroad in 1890. The Northern Pacific Railway purchased this line from Summit, Washington, to Montesano shortly after the PS&GH started operations. The NP then completed a line from Centralia to Elma and from Montesano to Grays Harbor bringing rail service to Grays Harbor in 1892.

Operations
The railroad's main commodities are timber products, garbage, as well as chemicals. In 2011 The Port of Grays Harbor saw a steady increase in business due to it being the only deep sea port near Seattle. The line from Centralia, Washington to Grays Harbor, Washington now has unit grain, soy bean, soda ash, auto, garbage, and military trains in addition to their regular local traffic. BNSF Railway and Union Pacific Railroad locomotive power are considered home on the PSAP as they run through on these unit trains to Grays Harbor, Washington for unloading. These run through trains are operated by PSAP crews. The PSAP hauled around 80,000 carloads in 2011.

Subdivisions

Elma Subdivision

The Elma Subdivision is the primary mainline for the Puget Sound and Pacific Railroad and is approximately 70 miles in length. The Elma Sub starts in Centralia, Washington, Milepost 5, and ends in Hoquiam, Washington, Milepost 75. This subdivision handles traffic to and from the Port of Grays Harbor including grain, autos, soda ash, soybean, garbage, manifest, and local trains.

Shelton Subdivision

The Shelton Subdivision stretches from Elma, Washington to Shelton, Washington and is approximately 26 miles in length. The primary commodities on the Shelton Sub are lumber, garbage, and propane gas cars. The loaded lumber comes from the Simpson Timber Railroad, which is part of the Simpson Investment Company empire. Garbage comes from the Kitsap County, Washington Olympic View Transfer Station in Bremerton, Washington. The garbage is loaded into container cars and is shipped via rail to Waste Management's Columbia Ridge Landfill in Arlington, Oregon. Propane is heavily used by Kitsap County, Washington residents in the fall, winter, and spring months and comes in via rail for destinations in Shelton, Washington, Belfair, Washington, and Bremerton, Washington.

Bangor & Bremerton Subdivisions

The Bangor Subdivision stretches from Shelton, Washington to Bangor Base, Washington and is approximately 48 miles in length. Primary commodities are the same as the Shelton Subdivision with the addition of military and other U.S. Government traffic from Naval Base Kitsap in Bremerton, Washington and Bangor Base, Washington. At Bremerton Junction, Milepost 32.1 on the Bangor Sub, the line splits and the Bangor Subdivision continues northwest to Silverdale, Washington and Bangor while the Bremerton Subdivision continues northeast to Bremerton, Washington.

References

External links

Website

Washington (state) railroads
Railway companies established in 1997
RailAmerica
Spin-offs of the BNSF Railway